"Let's Talk About Us" is a song written by Otis Blackwell and originally recorded by Jerry Lee Lewis, who released it as a single, with "The Ballad of Billy Joe" on the other side, in July 1959 on Sun Records.

Billboard chose the single as a "spotlight winner of the week". The review stated that the single contained "two fine sides", either of which "could go" and that Jerry Lee Lewis could "hit the comeback trail" with the songs. "The Ballad of Billy Joe" was described as a "strong ballad effort, akin to 'Don't Take Your Guns to Town'", and "Let's Talk About Us" as a "rhythm item more in [Lewis's] normal style".

The song has been covered by a number of artists, including Otis Blackwell himself, Dave Edmunds, and Van Morrison in duo with Linda Gail Lewis.

Track listing

References 

1959 songs
1959 singles
Jerry Lee Lewis songs
Songs written by Otis Blackwell
Song recordings produced by Jerry Kennedy
Sun Records singles
Rock-and-roll songs